CTV2 (full name: The Cool Cafe: Cool Tape Vol. 2) is the second mixtape by American rapper Jaden Smith. It was released as a free download on November 18, 2014, through his "Jaden Experience" app and was also available on DatPiff. The project is a concept mixtape, written about how Jaden Smith "attempted to turn the hip-hop world upside down". The mixtape is a part of Smith's Cool Tape series which was preceded by The Cool Cafe: Cool Tape Vol. 1 and followed up with The Sunset Tapes: A Cool Tape Story  and CTV3: Cool Tape Vol. 3. 

The mixtape was later re-released onto streaming services on December 1, 2016.

Track listing 
Credits adapted from YouTube.

References

 

2014 mixtape albums
Jaden Smith albums
Sequel albums